On 11 May 2016, the Islamic State conducted a series of attacks in and near Baghdad, the capital of Iraq, killing at least 110 people and wounding more than 165. According to ISIL, attacks were aimed at Shia fighters.

Attacks
The first attack, a truck bombing, exploded in a crowded outdoor market in the eastern part of Sadr City, killing mostly women and children. Later in the day, a suicide attack occurred in the Shiite Kadhimiya neighborhood, killing 18 and wounding 43. In the Jamea district in western Baghdad, another car bomb went off in the afternoon, killing at least 13 people. At least seven people were killed and twenty others were wounded in the car bomb explosion that took place in al-Rabie’ street in western Baghdad. More bombings killed over 101 people on May 17.

There were also many attacks outside of Baghdad of the same day, some attributed to ISIL. Five mortar shells fell near residential houses in the vicinity near Baqubah, resulting in the death of two civilians and wounding three others. An explosive device that was emplaced on the roadside near Baqubah went off while a taxi was passing in the area, resulting in the injury of two persons that were inside it. Five young civilians volunteered to shoot five Iraqi soldiers, accused of apostasy, in their heads for ISIL. The attacks were preceded by another bombing in Samawa on May 1.

Background
Iraqi Shia militias were fighting alongside the Iraqi army against the Islamic State (ISIS). The area of Sadr City saw repeated attacks targeting its Shia population. In February 2016 a pair of ISIL bombings in Sadr City killed 52 people. The market bombed on 11 May is one of the main four outdoor shopping venues in Sadr City.

Bombing
According to an eyewitness, the bomb in Sadr City was placed in a pickup truck loaded with fruit and vegetables. The truck had parked and then its driver quickly disappeared among the crowd, according to an eyewitness who also noted that the explosion jolted the ground. The responsibility for the attack was claimed by ISIL, which released a related statement on social media saying it intended to target Shiite fighters. Iraqi officials denied ISIL's claim that the attack was carried out by a suicide bomber.

References

2016 murders in Iraq
21st-century mass murder in Iraq
2010s in Baghdad
Car and truck bombings in Iraq
ISIL terrorist incidents in Iraq
Mass murder in 2016
May 2016 crimes in Asia
Suicide bombings in Baghdad
Terrorist incidents in Iraq in 2016
Terrorist incidents in Sadr City
Violence against Shia Muslims in Iraq
Islamic terrorist incidents in 2016